Paul Müller-Kaempff (1861–1941) was a German painter, illustrator and lithographer. He is associated with the Düsseldorf school of painting.

Biography
Kaempff received his first training from 1883 to 1886 at the Düsseldorf Academy of Fine Arts, then at the Academy of Karlsruhe under :de:Gustav Schönleber (1851–1917) and finally at the Berlin Academy in the studio of Hans Gude (1825–1903).

In 1905 he married his student, Else Schwager, and was appointed professor a year later. From 1908 he lived in Hamburg, later becoming a member of the Hamburg Artists Association. In 1904 he and his wife were founder members of the Oldenburg Art Society.

Müller-Kaempff was a successful landscape artist. He produced watercolours, pastels and drawings as well as furniture designs and a multitude of postcards. He was also an accomplished lithographer and produced bird illustrations for the revised edition of Naumann's "Naturgeschichte der Vögel Mitteleuropas". During his lifetime his works were acquired by museums in Rostock, Oldenburg, Kiel and Hamburg, and bought by numerous private collectors as far afield as Argentina and China.  Prince Eitel Friedrich, the second son of Emperor Wilhelm II, acquired several of Müller-Kaempff's pieces for the imperial court in 1908. Müller-Kaempff stayed in touch with his former fellow-student, Georg Müller vom Siel, and visited him at Dötlingen in June 1908.

On a hike in 1889 with his friend, Oskar Frenzel (1855–1915), they discovered the secluded fishing village of Ahrenshoop. Müller-Kaempff was so inspired by the isolated hamlet that he moved there, built himself a house in 1892, and started the painting school of St. Lucas in 1894.

Selected paintings

Sources
 Paul Müller-Kaempff: "Erinnerungen an Ahrenshoop" In: Mecklenburgische Monatshefte, Schwerin, Bd. 2 (1926), 7, S. 333–336. (Digitalized) 
 Konrad Mahlfeld: Paul Müller-Kaempff. Begründer der Künstlerkolonie Ahrenshoop.  Hasenverlag, Halle (Saale) 2010, .
 Wolf Karge: Paul Müller-Kaempff : 1841 Oldenburg – Ahrenshoop – Berlin 1941. Mit einem Beitrag von Friedrich Schulz, Verlag Atelier im Bauernhaus, Fischerhude 2006, .
Paul Müller-Kaempff. In: Ulrich Thieme, Felix Becker u. a.: Allgemeines Lexikon der Bildenden Künstler von der Antike bis zur Gegenwart. Vol. XXV, E. A. Seemann, Leipzig 1931, S. 245.
Paul Müller-Kaempff. In: Hans Vollmer: Allgemeines Lexikon der bildenden Künstler des XX. Jahrhunderts. Vol. 5. E. A. Seemann, Leipzig 1961, S. 409

References

External links
 
 Paul Müller-Kaempff website
"150 Jahre Paul Müller-Kaempff – Vom Meisterschüler zum Professor" @ the Mecklenburg Kunst Galerie.

1861 births
1941 deaths
19th-century German painters
19th-century German male artists
German male painters
20th-century German painters
20th-century German male artists
German lithographers
Kunstakademie Düsseldorf alumni
Prussian Academy of Arts alumni
20th-century German printmakers
20th-century lithographers
Düsseldorf school of painting